Nazim-e-Larkana is the Mayor who heads the Larkana Municipal Corporation (LMC) which controls the Local Government system of Larkana.

Larkana Municipal Corporation 

There are 20 Union Councils in larkana Municipal Corporation(LMC), the body which controls local government of Larkana. The Union Councils elect their chairmen and Vice Chairmen who then elect their Mayor and Deputy Mayor respectively.

List of mayors

Mayor elections history

Mayor election 2015 

The election for local govt of Larkana was held on October 31, 2015

The mayor and deputy mayor of Larkana were elected on August 24, 2016, and took oath in August 2016.

See also 
 Mayor of Sukkur

References

External links 
 Sindh Local Govt Act 2013

Larkana